Pyaar is a 1950 Hindi-language film produced and directed by V. M. Vyas, starring Raj Kapoor and Nargis in the lead roles, with Yakub, Shyama and Nawab in supporting roles. The music was composed by S. D. Burman. The film is based on a story written by Mohanlal G. Dave.

Cast 
Raj Kapoor as Banke
Nargis as Rani
Yakub Khan Mehboob Khan
Shyama
Nawab
Kesari
Wazir Mohammad Khan
Gulab
Parvati Devi

Soundtrack 
The music was composed by S. D. Burman, with lyrics by Rajinder Krishan. It marked the only time Kishore Kumar sung for Raj Kapoor.

Songs

References

External links 
 

1950 films
1950s Hindi-language films
Indian drama films
1950 drama films
Indian black-and-white films